KXXA was a radio station on 1560 AM in Monette, Arkansas, United States, operating between 1964 and 1986.

History

The Buffalo Island Broadcasting Company signed on KBIB in September 1964. The station was sold to George Norman Wimpy in 1967, Buffalo Island Communications in 1971, Craighead County Broadcasting in 1974, and KBIB Radio in 1977.
After owner Leon Buck died in 1980 and the station transferred to Mack Toombs, Frederick D. Reagan acquired KBIB in 1982 for $80,000 and gave it new KXXA call letters. KXXA aired a country format. The license was deleted in 1986.

References

External links
FCC History Cards for KXXA

Radio stations established in 1964
Radio stations disestablished in 1986
XXA
Defunct radio stations in the United States
1964 establishments in Arkansas
1986 disestablishments in Arkansas

XXA
XXA